Maximum Fantastic Four is a 224-page coffee table art book focused on the art of Jack Kirby in 1961's Fantastic Four #1. This project was conceived of and orchestrated by Walter Mosley. It has been reprinted numerous times.

External links 
 UGO.com article

2005 non-fiction books
Books about visual art
Marvel Comics titles
Works by Walter Mosley
Fantastic Four
Adaptations of works by Jack Kirby